Amy Lee Nixon (born September 29, 1977) is a Canadian retired curler and lawyer from Calgary, Alberta. She was a member of the bronze medal-winning 2006 Winter Olympic women's curling team, skipped by Shannon Kleibrink. Nixon was also the chair of the board of governors of Curling Canada from 2021 to 2022.

Curling career
Nixon began curling competitively at fourteen. Her first notable success was being a gold medal-winning skip at the Saskatchewan Winter Games in 1994, which she followed up with a 10th-place finish at the 1995 Canada Games. She would later move to Alberta, where she was the runner-up at the 1998 provincial junior championship, losing the Alberta final to Bronwen Saunders.

Nixon was a member of the Shannon Kleibrink mixed curling team that represented Alberta at the 2003 Canadian Mixed Curling Championship. It was the first time ever that a woman (Kleibrink) skipped a team at the Canadian Mixed. The team had Nixon (who threw second stones), hold the broom for Kleibrink's shots, allowing both male team members to sweep Kleibrink's stones, a unique advantage for the team. At the 2003 Mixed, the team made it to the final, where they lost to Nova Scotia's Paul Flemming rink.

Nixon joined Kleibrink's women's team in 2003. The team found success in their first season together, winning the Alberta Hearts, and representing Alberta at the 2004 Scott Tournament of Hearts, where they went 6–5.

As a third for Kleibrink, Nixon shared in several successes in the women's game, including winning the Canada Cup in 2005 and 2009, and the 2005 Canadian Olympic Curling Trials. The team represented Canada at the 2006 Winter Olympics in Turin, where they won the bronze medal. In addition to the 2004 Hearts, the team also represented Alberta at the 2008 Scotties Tournament of Hearts, where they were runners-up and at the 2011 Scotties Tournament of Hearts, finishing with a 6–5 record.

After the Kleibrink rink lost in the B final of the 2012 Alberta Scotties Tournament of Hearts, Nixon was added as the alternate on the winning Heather Nedohin team after the event. The team represented Alberta at the 2012 Scotties Tournament of Hearts, which they won. They then went on to represent Canada at the 2012 World Women's Curling Championship, where they won the bronze medal. At the end of the 2011–2012 curling season, Nixon announced she would leave team Kleibrink, effective at the end of the 2012 Pomeroy Inn & Suites Prairie Showdown, to form her own team.

After a few seasons skipping her own team, and one season playing for Nedohin, Nixon joined the Chelsea Carey rink in 2015. The team won the 2016 Alberta Hearts and the 2016 Scotties Tournament of Hearts for Alberta. They then represented Canada at the 2016 World Women's Curling Championship, where they finished in 4th place. As defending champions, they represented Team Canada at the 2017 Scotties Tournament of Hearts. There, they ended up finishing third. After the event, Nixon announced her retirement from competitive curling.

Personal life
At the age of four she moved with her family to Regina, Saskatchewan, where she grew up. She moved to Calgary in 1995, where she now resides. Nixon is an alumnus of the University of Calgary with three degrees in kinesiology, women's studies and law. She was admitted to the Alberta bar in November 2006. Nixon has been employed at Mount Royal University since 2011, and has been a university solicitor there since 2017. She is married to Mike Westlund and has one child.  Nixon's father, Daryl, was the coach of the 2006 Olympic women's curling team.

Nixon was elected as Chair of Curling Canada's Board of Governors in June 2021, replacing Mitch Minken who stepped down for personal reasons. She was re-elected a few months later to begin a full two-year term.

Grand Slam record

Former events

Teams

Notes

References

 http://thechronicleherald.ca/sports/1196435-truro-s-iskiw-taking-year-off-curling
 http://www.curling.ca/blog/2012/01/16/featured-curling-athlete-amy-nixon/

External links 
 

1977 births
Living people
Curlers from Calgary
Curlers at the 2006 Winter Olympics
Canadian women curlers
Lawyers in Alberta
Medalists at the 2006 Winter Olympics
Olympic bronze medalists for Canada
Olympic curlers of Canada
Olympic medalists in curling
Curlers from Saskatoon
Curlers from Regina, Saskatchewan
Canadian women lawyers
Canadian women's curling champions
Continental Cup of Curling participants
Canada Cup (curling) participants
Curling Canada presidents